Dorcadion obenbergeri is a species of beetle in the family Cerambycidae. It was described by Heyrovsky in 1940. It is known from Greece.

References

obenbergeri
Beetles described in 1940